Kusŏng station is a railway station of the Korean State Railway in Yŏkchŏn-dong, Kusŏng city, North P'yŏngan Province, North Korea, on the P'yŏngbuk Line of the Korean State Railway. It is also the western terminus of the Ch'ŏngnyŏn P'arwŏn Line.

History
Kusŏng station, originally called P'yŏngbuk Kusŏng station, was opened along with the rest of the line by the Pyongbuk Railway on 27 September 1939.

Services
Kusŏng station is served by semi-express trains 115/116 between P'yŏngyang and Ch'ŏngsu, long-distance stopping trains 200/201 between West P'yŏngyang and Ch'ŏngsu, and regional trains 795/796 between Kusŏng and Kujang Ch'ŏngnyŏn. It is also served by commuter trains on the Kusŏng—Paegun (5 pairs) and Chŏngju–Kusŏng (2 pairs) sections of the line.

References

Railway stations in North Korea